Night Train to Murder is a 1985 British comedy television film, directed by Joseph McGrath and starring Morecambe and Wise. It was the last work that Eric Morecambe and Ernie Wise worked on together before Morecambe's death in 1984 (the comedian being in poor health at the time of filming). It was written as a pastiche of the works of writers including Agatha Christie and Edgar Wallace, and is set in 1946—featuring Morecambe and Wise ostensibly as 1940s versions of themselves.

The duo's move from the BBC to Thames in 1978 was a much publicised media event, and one of the main reasons for their move was to make films and move away from the format of The Morecambe & Wise Show that had proved so popular in the previous decade. The film was completed in March 1983, but not screened until after Morecambe's death the following year. It was originally made with a laughter track, but this was absent when broadcast, and again so when later released on both VHS and DVD.

The film features a plot of family members dying in strange circumstances and the two leads are drawn into this when Eric's niece Kathy (Lysette Anthony) is visited by the family's lawyer, played by Fulton Mackay. It was made largely on location, produced on videotape, and was originally broadcast on ITV on 3 January 1985. The closing moments of the film see Eric and Ernie walking off together, onto the next gig, making it their final screen image together.

Cast
 Eric Morecambe as Eric Morecambe
 Ernie Wise as Ernie Wise
 Margaret Courtenay as Dame Flora
 Kenneth Haigh as Cousin Milton / Cousin Homer
 Fulton Mackay as Mackay
 Pamela Salem as Cousin Zelda
 Lysette Anthony as Kathy Chalmers
 Roger Brierley as Chief Superintendent Rivers
 Edward Judd as  Knife Thrower
 Ben Aris as Theatre Manager
 Tony Boncza as Joe
 Frank Coda as  Stage Manager
 Mike Crane as Big Jim 
 Robert Longden as Vicar
 Penny Meredith as Mrs. Manzini
 Tim Stern as Tiny Big Jim
 Richard Vernon as Uncle Felix

External links
Morecambe & Wise website
Eric And Ern – Keeping The Magic Alive **Book, Film, TV Reviews, Interviews**
 

1984 television specials
Morecambe and Wise
ITV comedy
Television series by Fremantle (company)
Television shows produced by Thames Television
English-language television shows
British television films
Films set on trains
Films directed by Joseph McGrath (film director)